The 2006–07 Liga III season was the 51st season of Liga III, the third tier of the Romanian football league system. It was the first in this format (six series of 18 teams each).

The winners of each division got promoted to the 2007–08 Liga II season. There were also two playoff tournaments held at neutral venues involving the second placed teams, one with those from series 1, 2 and 3, the other with those from series 4, 5, and 6. The winners of the playoffs also got promoted to the 2007–08 Liga II season.
The bottom three from each division were relegated at the end of the season to the county football leagues (Liga IV). From the 15th placed teams, another three were relegated. To determine these teams, separate standings were computed, using only the games played against clubs ranked 1st through 14th.

Standings

Seria I

Seria II

Seria III

Seria IV

Seria V

Seria VI

Playoffs

Group 1 

Pambac Bacău – Juventus București 0–1
Juventus București – Inter Gaz București 1–1
Pambac Bacău – Inter Gaz București 0–3

Group 2 

Luceafărul Băile Felix – Minerul Motru 3–0
Mureșul Deva – Luceafărul Băile Felix 1–0
Minerul Motru – Mureșul Deva 0–5

See also 

 2006–07 Liga I
 2006–07 Liga II

References

Liga III seasons
3
Romania